This is an alphabetical list of cricketers who have played for Northern Diamonds since their founding in 2020. They first played in the Rachael Heyhoe Flint Trophy, a 50 over competition that began in 2020. In 2021, the Twenty20 Charlotte Edwards Cup was added to the women's domestic structure in England.

Players' names are followed by the years in which they were active as a Northern Diamonds player. Seasons given are first and last seasons; the player did not necessarily play in all the intervening seasons. Current players are shown as active to the latest season in which they played for the club. This list only includes players who appeared in at least one match for Northern Diamonds; players who were named in the team's squad for a season but did not play a match are not included.

A
 Hollie Armitage (2020–2022)

B
 Katherine Brunt (2020–2022)

C
 Ami Campbell (2020–2021)

D
 Leah Dobson (2021–2022)

F
 Helen Fenby (2020–2021)

G
 Abigail Glen (2022)
 Phoebe Graham (2020–2021)
 Yvonne Graves (2022)
 Jenny Gunn (2020–2022)

H
 Bess Heath (2020–2022)
 Mariko Hill (2022)
 Rachel Hopkins (2020–2022)

K
 Sterre Kalis (2020–2022)
 Leigh Kasperek (2022)

L
 Beth Langston (2020–2022)
 Katie Levick (2020–2022)

M
 Alex MacDonald (2020–2021)
 Emma Marlow (2022)

S
 Nat Sciver (2020–2022)
 Lizzie Scott (2022)
 Rachel Slater (2021–2022)
 Linsey Smith (2020–2022)

T
 Sarah Taylor (2021)
 Ella Telford (2021)
 Layla Tipton (2020)
 Phoebe Turner (2022)

W
 Lauren Winfield-Hill (2020–2022)
 Jessica Woolston (2022)

Captains

See also
 List of Yorkshire Diamonds cricketers

References

Northern Diamonds